Villainy Inc. is a team of fictional characters appearing in DC Comics publications and related media, commonly as an alliance of recurring adversaries of the superhero Wonder Woman. The group debuted in 1948’s Wonder Woman #28, though each of its eight initial members had previously appeared as villains in earlier Wonder Woman adventures. Historically, Wonder Woman #28 holds a distinction as the final issue of the series to be written by the heroine’s creator William Moulton Marston before his death.

Three different incarnations of Villainy Inc. have appeared in DC Comics publications: (1) the Golden Age version, led by Eviless, (2) the Modern Age version, led by Queen Clea, and (3) the Rebirth-era version, led by Doctor Psycho and masterminded by Hera. Of these, the Golden and Modern Age incarnations consisted exclusively of women characters, although three Golden Age figures among them – Blue Snowman, Doctor Poison and Hypnota – would likely be construed by 21st century readers as gender non-conforming. (Since 2021, Blue Snowman has been specifically presented by writers as a genderfluid character.)

The team was adapted for the 2019 Warner Brothers animated film  Wonder Woman: Bloodlines, in which it was led by Doctor Cyber and masterminded by Veronica Cale.

Publication History

Golden Age
Villainy Inc. debuted in Wonder Woman #28, in the last story written by series creator William Moulton Marston. The villains, who were individually sentenced to and later escaped from a prison on the Amazon penal colony Transformation Island, teamed up to take down their common enemies, who are led by the Saturnine slaver Eviless, who tricked the Amazons into believing she had lost her evil nature and stole Wonder Woman's lasso. Eviless faked her death and tried to release the prisoners on Transformation Island, most of whom refused but some agreed with Eviless and joined her. They captured Hippolyta using the lasso as Blue Snowman, Poison, and Hypnota lured Eviless into a trap. Hippolyta was then taken from the island. Later, the villains captured Hippolyta and took her away in a boat but Hippolyta drags the boat underwater and saves Eviless, who cannot swim. Clea tried to buy a submarine from Steve Trevor to return to Atlantis but Trevor recognized Clea and captured her. Giganta knocked out Trevor, and Clea and her aide decided to capture the Holliday Girls and Wonder Woman to force him to give them a submarine. They imprison the Holliday Girls in Professor Zool's lab and Giganta attacks Wonder Woman but is overpowered. This partially worked and they forced Wonder Woman to steal a US Navy submarine for them but Clea and Giganta were recaptured before their sub could fully submerge. The escapees were returned to Transformation Island by Wonder Woman and the Amazons.

Modern Age
Following the retcons in Crisis on Infinite Earths, the group's history begins when they menace Hippolyta in the Golden Age. Cheetah, Zara, Doctor Poison and Hypnotic Woman (formerly Hypnota) were assembled by Queen Clea. The Atlantean monarch of the city Venturia enlists the others to defeat her rival city Aurania. They are repeatedly foiled by Hippolyta. Later, Hippolyta's daughter Diana travels back in time and discovers them in battle. Clea is defeated by Diana, who disguises herself as Miss America, and Clea's daughter Ptra.

In recent times, when all of Atlantis disappears from the Earth, Clea again sets out to assemble a new Villainy, Inc. and conquer a land to rule. Together they descend upon the other-dimensional land of Skartaris. Clea uses Cyborgirl to take control of the entire dimension. Clea's plan, however, is commandeered by Trinity, who is revealed to be a virus that was engineered by the founders of Skartaris. When the "Trinity Virus" is reintroduced into Skartaris' governing computer system, the and begins to regress and devolve to its origins. Wonder Woman stope the process from becoming permanent but some of Skartaris' inhabitants, including Clea, arere lost in the de-evolution.

Members

Golden Age

Modern Age

Post-Rebirth Era

In other media
Villainy Inc. appears Wonder Woman: Bloodlines, created and secretly backed by Veronica Cale with Doctor Cyber and Doctor Poison serving as figureheads and consisting of Giganta, the Cheetah, and Silver Swan. This version of the group is a criminal organization that employs henchmen and uses enhancement drugs to strengthen themselves. They seek to revive and weaponize Medusa so they can invade Themyscira and steal their advanced technology. However, Medusa betrays them, destroying Cyber and killing Poison before using the latter's enhancement drug to enlarge herself and go on a rampage to destroy the Amazons. In response, Silver Swan defects to and helps Wonder Woman vanquish the monster.

See also
 List of Wonder Woman enemies

References

External links
 Cosmic Teams Profile
 The Unofficial Villainy Inc. Biography, DCU Guide
 Wonder Woman Villains Rapsheets

Comics characters introduced in 1948
Characters created by H. G. Peter
Characters created by William Moulton Marston
DC Comics supervillain teams
Wonder Woman characters
DC Comics female supervillains